James A. Winnefeld may refer to:
James A. Winnefeld Sr. (1929–2015), American navy rear admiral
James A. Winnefeld Jr. (born 1956), American navy admiral